Kuessipan is a Canadian drama film, directed by Myriam Verreault and released in 2019. An adaptation of the novel by Naomi Fontaine, the film centres on Mikuan (Sharon Ishpatao Fontaine) and Shaniss (Yamie Grégoire), two young Innu women in Uashat-Maliotenam, whose lifelong friendship is tested when one of them falls in love with a white man (Étienne Galloy) and plans to move away.

The film's cast also includes Douglas Grégoire and Brigitte Poupart.

Cinematographer Nicolas Canniccioni and Verreault filmed it in Innu Takuaikan Uashat Mak Mani-Utenam and Sept-Îles, Quebec.

The film premiered at the 2019 Toronto International Film Festival.

Accolades
At the 2019 Vancouver International Film Festival, Myriam Verreault received a special mention for Kuessipan in the Emerging Canadian Director category.

References

External links
 
 

2019 films
Canadian drama films
First Nations films
Algonquian-language films
Films based on Canadian novels
Quebec films
Films shot in Quebec
French-language Canadian films
2010s Canadian films